Sørlandets Travpark is a harness racing track located in Kristiansand, Norway. Owned by Norwegian Trotting Association, its tote betting is handled by Norsk Rikstoto. The venue opened on 16 July 1988.

References

External links
 Official website

Sports venues in Kristiansand
Harness racing venues in Norway
Sports venues completed in 1988
1988 establishments in Norway